Madanapalle Assembly constituency is a constituency of Andhra Pradesh Legislative Assembly, India. It is one among 6 constituencies in Annamayya district.

Mandals

Members of Legislative Assembly

Election results

Assembly elections 1952

Assembly elections 2014

Assembly elections 2019

See also
 List of constituencies of Andhra Pradesh Vidhan Sabha

References

Assembly constituencies of Andhra Pradesh